In statistics, an influential observation is an observation for a statistical calculation whose deletion from the dataset would noticeably change the result of the calculation. In particular, in regression analysis an influential observation is one whose deletion has a large effect on the parameter estimates.

Assessment 
Various methods have been proposed for measuring influence. Then we have the following measures of influence:

 , where  denotes the coefficients estimated with the i-th row  of  deleted,  denotes the i-th value of matrix's  main diagonal. Thus DFBETA measures the difference in each parameter estimate with and without the influential point. There is a DFBETA for each variable and each observation (if there are N observations and k variables there are N·k DFBETAs). Table shows DFBETAs for the third dataset from Anscombe's quartet (bottom left chart in the figure):

Outliers, leverage and influence 

An outlier may be defined as a data point that differs significantly from other observations.
A high-leverage point are observations made at extreme values of independent variables.
Both types of atypical observations will force the regression line to be close to the point. 
In Anscombe's quartet, the bottom right image has a point with high leverage and the bottom left image has an outlying point.

See also 
 Influence function (statistics)
 Outlier
 Leverage
 Partial leverage
 Regression analysis
 
 Anomaly detection

References

Further reading 
 
 

Actuarial science
Regression diagnostics
Robust statistics